The Basque Nationalist Republican Party (in Spanish: Partido Republicano Nacionalista Vasco) was a political party in Euskadi, Spain. PRNV was founded in 1911, as a progressive alternative to the conservative Basque Nationalist Party (PNV). PRNV was modelled after the Republican Nationalist Federal Union (UFNR) in Catalonia. The party dissolved in 1913.

References

Political parties in the Basque Country (autonomous community)
Basque nationalism